Luzhou District is an inner city district in northwestern New Taipei City, Taiwan. It is the second smallest district in New Taipei City after Yonghe District.

History
Historically the area was called Lō·-chiu (鷺州) and Hê-siūⁿ-chiu (和尙州). On 6 October 1997, Luzhou was upgraded from a rural township to a county-administered city (postal: Loochow) in the former Taipei County. On 25 December 2010, Taipei County was upgraded to New Taipei City, subsequently Luzhou was upgraded into a district.

Geography
It has an area of 7.4351 km2 and a population of 199,964 people in 74,056 households as of May 2022. Luzhou has the second highest population density in Taiwan (after Yonghe) and 13th in the world, with over 26,600 people per km2.

Education
 National Open University
 St. Ignatius High School
 Sanmin Senior High School

Tourist attractions
Forbidden City Museum (紫禁城博物館)
The Luzhou Lee Family Historic Estate (蘆洲李宅)
St. Ignatius Plaza (徐匯廣場)
Luzhou Night Market
Yong-Lian Temple

Transportation

The Orange Line of the Taipei Metro serves Luzhou with via St. Ignatius High School metro station, Sanmin Senior High School metro station, and Luzhou metro station.

The Yellow Line will serve Luzhou in the future.

Notable natives
 Cheer Chen, singer
 Holger Chen, Internet celebrity
 Lin Rong-san, founder of Liberty Times
 Lin Yu-lin, real estate developer
 Tia Lee, singer, actress and model

References

External links

  
Luzhou City Household Registration Office

Districts of New Taipei